Vietomartyria expeditionis is a species of moth belonging to the family Micropterigidae. It was described by Wolfram Mey in 1997. It is known from the mountainous areas of northern Vietnam.

The length of the forewings is 3.8 mm.

References

Micropterigidae
Moths described in 1997